"Singing My Sister Down" is a 2004 fantasy short story by Australian writer Margo Lanagan.

Background
"Singing My Sister Down" was first published in 2004 in the author's first collection of short stories, Black Juice and published by Allen & Unwin.  The story was later published in The Year's Best Fantasy & Horror: Eighteenth Annual Collection edited by Ellen Datlow, Kelly Link, and Gavin J. Grant; The Year's Best Australian Science Fiction and Fantasy (Volume 1) edited by Bill Congreve and Michelle Marquardt; and The Weird: A Compendium of Strange and Dark Stories edited by Jeff VanderMeer and Ann VanderMeer.

Synopsis

"In Margo Lanagan’s “Singing My Sister Down”, a young boy watches as his sister Ikky is publicly executed, not by lethal injection or firing squad, but by slow submersion in a tar pit. Ikky’s crime is never explicitly discussed, although it is inferred that she killed her husband with an axe (which calls to mind Lizzie Borden, the supposed female murderer who has become a part of American folklore and the public imagination at large). An intimate moment with family becomes a public event, as Ikky sinks further into the deeps, and a young woman accused of murder becomes fodder for the eagerly watching crowds."

Awards

 2004 Aurealis Awards – Young Adult Short Story – winner
 2004 Bram Stoker Award – Superior Achievement in Short Fiction – nominated
 2004 International Horror Guild Award- Best Short Form – nominated
 2005 World Fantasy Award – Best Short Fiction – winner
 2005 Ditmar Award – Best Short Story – winner
 2005 Theodore Sturgeon Award – nominated
 2006 Hugo Award – Best Short Story – nominated
 2006 Nebula Award – Short Story – nominated

References

2004 short stories
Australian short stories
Fantasy short stories
Aurealis Award-winning works
World Fantasy Award-winning works